Ten Hands is a rock band based in Denton, Texas, United States. The band consists of:

J. Paul Slavens (keyboards, lead vocals),
Steve Brand (guitar, backing vocals),
Gary Muller (Chapman stick, backing vocals),
Mike Dillon (percussion, backing vocals),
Alan Emert (drums, backing vocals).

Described as a cross between the jazz-rock-art style of Frank Zappa and the psychedelic punk of the Meat Puppets, Ten Hands had a style that was better appreciated live, more so than in the studio.  The late 1980s local scene adored them and the Dallas Observer awarded Ten Hands numerous accolades in 1988-1989.

The band performed regularly from the mid 1980s through 1995. Since 2014, they have been playing regular shows several times a year in the Dallas area, with various lineups.

Discography

External links

References

Rock music groups from Texas